John McMorran (11 May 1934 – 10 January 2001) was a Scottish professional footballer who played as an inside right.

Career
Born in Forth, McMorran joined Bradford City from Forth Wanderers in December 1954. He made 1 league appearance for the club. He was released by the club in 1955, and later played for Guildford City.

Sources

References

1934 births
2001 deaths
Scottish footballers
Forth Wanderers F.C. players
Bradford City A.F.C. players
Guildford City F.C. players
English Football League players
Association football inside forwards